Willow Camille Reign Smith (born October 31, 2000), known mononymously as Willow (stylized in all caps), is an American singer and actress. The daughter of actors Will Smith and Jada Pinkett Smith, she has received various accolades, including a Young Artist Award, an NAACP Image Award, a BET Award, and nominations for two Daytime Emmy Awards and a MTV Video Music Award.

Smith made her acting debut in 2007 in the film I Am Legend along with her father Will Smith, and later appeared in Kit Kittredge: An American Girl alongside Abigail Breslin. In 2010, Smith launched her music career with the platinum-certified single "Whip My Hair", which peaked at number 11 on the Billboard Hot 100. Smith later signed to her mentor Jay-Z's record label Roc Nation, becoming the youngest artist signed to the label, and released the single "21st Century Girl" the following year.

Smith's debut album, Ardipithecus, was released in 2015. Its single "Wait a Minute!" was certified double platinum by the Recording Industry Association of America. Smith would later release her second album The 1st (2017), and her third album Willow (2019). Smith began co-hosting the Facebook Watch talk show Red Table Talk in 2018, which has earned her two NAACP Image Awards and two Daytime Emmy Award nominations. In 2021, Smith released her fourth album Lately I Feel Everything, which spawned the single "Transparent Soul", which was certified gold in the US. Later that year, she earned another top 40 entry on the Billboard Hot 100 with the single "Meet Me at Our Spot" as part of The Anxiety with Tyler Cole.

Early life
Willow Camille Reign Smith was born on October 31, 2000, in Los Angeles, California. She is the daughter of the actress-musician Jada Pinkett Smith and actor-musician Will Smith. She has two older siblings: her brother Jaden Smith, an actor and musician, and her half-brother Willard Carroll "Trey" Smith III, an actor and DJ. Smith and her siblings are youth ambassadors for Project Zambi, which, in conjunction with Hasbro, provides assistance for Zambian children orphaned by AIDS.

Smith attended Sierra Canyon School in Los Angeles.

Career

2007–2013: Acting and music endeavors

Smith made her acting debut in I Am Legend alongside her father. Her next film, Kit Kittredge: An American Girl, was released on July 2, 2008. In 2008, she voiced the character of young Gloria the hippo in Madagascar: Escape 2 Africa, alongside her mother as Gloria the hippo.

In June 2009, Smith's mother Jada Pinkett Smith announced in an interview on Lopez Tonight that Smith would be releasing an album. Smith then released her first single, "Whip My Hair", which went platinum in the US and peaked at number 11 on the Billboard Hot 100. In the UK, the single peaked at number two. Its video was nominated for Video of the Year at the BET Awards of 2011. Smith soon after announced her next single, "21st Century Girl". After she performed the song on The Oprah Winfrey Show, she released it the next day on February 3, 2011. The video was released March 9, 2011. On January 20, 2011, Will Smith announced he was planning to produce a contemporary remake of the Broadway musical  Annie starring Smith in the title role. However, Smith was deemed too old and the title role was given to Quvenzhané Wallis in February 2013.

On October 6, 2011, "Fireball", a collaboration between Smith and rapper Nicki Minaj, was released. "Fireball" was a commercial failure, failing to chart in any type of music market, except the US R&B chart, charting at 121. It was her first song to miss the Billboard Hot 100. Smith's producer announced that she were almost finished working on her debut album, and that it would be done soon. He also said it has a similar style to "Whip My Hair". The title of the album was later announced to be Knees and Elbows. It was scheduled to be released around April 2012, but was later announced that it would be postponed for release later in the year. On May 1, 2012, she released a music video for "Do it Like Me (Rockstar)", saying that it was her "first video ever". On July 2, 2012, Smith released the "I Am Me" music video at the BET Awards. On July 17, she released her fourth single, "I Am Me" via iTunes and Amazon.

In the summer of 2013, Smith and DJ Fabrega started a duo titled "Melodic Chaotic". "The Intro" was released as the first work, "Summer Fling" was released as the second work of the two on July 6, 2013. The music video was directed by Smith and Mike Vargas who previously directed her single "I Am Me". The song has been widely criticized for its mature tone, the use of the word "fling", and the fake English accent she incorporates. On September 16, 2013, Smith performed "Summer Fling" on the series premiere of The Queen Latifah Show. During the performance, she said: "Just for clarity, the word fling means something that's short lived...And this song is dedicated to all the kids around the world whose summer is never long enough."

2014–2018: 3 EP, Ardipithecus, and The 1st
On October 24, 2014, Smith and FADER announced that Smith would be releasing her debut EP, titled "3", on October 31, 2014 for free via Google Play for limited time and November 10, 2014, but it was later pushed to November 17, 2014 via iTunes. The same day, she held a concert in New York City at The FADER Fort, where she performed select tracks from her new EP with SZA. She also performed the song "5" with her brother, as well as "Summer Fling" and a new rendition of her famous hit "Whip My Hair".

Smith released the single "F Q-C #7" on May 7, 2015. An accompanying music video was released the same day on Vevo. After release, on September, a video to the track "Why Don't You Cry" on i-D, Willow released her first album Ardipithecus on December 11. About her debut album's title, Willow said "Ardipithecus Ramidus  Sahelanthropus tchadensis is the scientific name of the first hominid bones found on earth. I wanted to name my musical compilation after it because, while I was making these songs, I was in such a transitional state. Digging deep in the soil of my heart and finding bits and pieces of my ancient self that tell stories, which end up being the lyrics to the songs."

On her birthday, October 31, 2017, she released her second album The 1st which is praised for its musical development, particularly Willow's ability to create music following her 1990s R&B predecessors, despite not having been alive during the time. She toured the album with Jhene Aiko alongside St. Beauty, Kodie Shane, and Kitty Cash through the end of 2017.

Along with her mother and grandmother, Adrienne Banfield-Norris, Smith hosts Red Table Talk, a web talk show for which she received a Daytime Emmy Award nomination.

2019–2021: Willow, The Anxiety, and Lately I Feel Everything
On June 24, 2019, Smith announced her third studio album, Willow. It was released on July 19, 2019, and was co-produced by herself and Tyler Cole. The duo later released a collaborative album titled The Anxiety in 2020. On April 27, 2021, Smith released "Transparent Soul" featuring Travis Barker, a pop-punk song that was her first foray into that genre. Smith released her fourth album Lately I Feel Everything on July 16, featuring guests artists including Tierra Whack and Avril Lavigne. In late 2021, "Meet Me at Our Spot" from The Anxiety reached the Billboard Hot 100, peaking at number 21. That same year, Time named her one of the 100 most influential people in the world. Also in 2021, she won Entertainer of the Year for her work on Red Table Talk at the EBONY Power 100 awards, and was placed on Billboard's 'Greatest Pop Stars of 2021' list, being named the 'Comeback Artist of the Year'. Smith was also placed on the 2022 Forbes 30 Under 30 list.

2022–present: Coping Mechanism
In February 2022, Willow announced that she had to pull out of Billie Eilish's Happier Than Ever World Tour due to production limitations. On April 8, 2022, Smith featured on Camila Cabello's track "Psychofreak" from Cabello's third studio album Familia. A music video for the song was released on the same day, followed by a live performance on Saturday Night Live.

Coping Mechanism is the fifth studio album by Smith. The album was released on October 7, 2022, through Roc Nation and Polydor, and features Yves Tumor.

In June 2022, Smith broadcast "Maybe It's My Fault", the first single from her fifth studio album.

In July 2022, Smith published the album art as well as the release date for the album. The following month, the singer put out "Hover Like a Goddess".

Personal life
In June 2019, Smith revealed that she is bisexual, stating: "I love men and women equally". She also mentioned her support of polyamorous relationships and her desire to be in one.

Discography

 Ardipithecus (2015)
 The 1st (2017)
 Willow (2019)
 Lately I Feel Everything (2021)
 Coping Mechanism (2022)

Collaborative albums
 The Anxiety (2020)

Filmography

Awards and nominations

References

External links

2000 births
21st-century American actresses
21st-century American singers
Actresses from Los Angeles
African-American female dancers
African-American women singers
African-American songwriters
Alternative rock singers
American child singers
American female dancers
American women pop singers
Child pop musicians
American mezzo-sopranos
Living people
Roc Nation artists
Singers from Los Angeles
American LGBT singers
Bisexual actresses
LGBT dancers
LGBT African Americans
Feminist musicians
American television actresses
African-American actresses
American film actresses
American child actresses
21st-century American women singers
Bisexual singers
LGBT people from California
The Society Management models
Sierra Canyon School alumni
American bisexual actors
Polyamorous people
American contemporary R&B singers
American alternative rock musicians
Dance-pop musicians
Will Smith